Isis Mussenden, (born May 22, 1959) is an American Costume designer and a member of the Costume Designers Guild. Mussenden won the 2006 Costume Designers Guild Award for excellence in fantasy film for The Chronicles of Narnia: The Lion, the Witch and the Wardrobe. Mussenden has worked on numerous well-known films including American Psycho, Drag Me to Hell, and Jay and Silent Bob Strike Back. Mussenden was invited to join the Academy of Motion Picture Arts and Sciences in 2008.

Filmography

Film 
 The Wolverine (film) (2013)
 The Chronicles of Narnia: The Voyage of the Dawn Treader (2010)
 Drag Me to Hell (2009)
 The Chronicles of Narnia: Prince Caspian (2008)
 The Chronicles of Narnia: The Lion, the Witch and the Wardrobe (2005)
 Shrek 2 (2004)
 Dirty Dancing: Havana Nights (2004)
 American Psycho (film) (2000)
 Jay and Silent Bob Strike Back (2001)
 Shrek (2001)
 The Astronaut's Wife (1999)
 Dante’s Peak (1997)

Television 
 The Wheel of Time (2021-)
 Masters of Sex (2013-2016)

References

External links

IsisMussenden.com

American costume designers
1959 births
Living people